"Que No Se Rompa la Noche" (English: May the Night Have No End) literally "May the Night not Break", is a ballad written and produced by Spanish singer-songwriter Manuel Alejandro, co-written by Ana Magdalena, and performed by Spanish singer Julio Iglesias. It was released as the second single from his studio album Un hombre solo (1987). This song became his second number one hit in the Billboard Hot Latin Tracks chart, after his previous single "Lo Mejor de Tu Vida".

"Qué No Se Rompa la Noche" has been covered by several singers, including Tamara, Pandora, Ray Conniff, Vikki Carr and Raulin Rosendo.

Background
"Que No Se Rompa la Noche" was released as the second single from Iglesias' Un hombre solo and became his second number-one hit in the Billboard Hot Latin Tracks, and his last on this chart as a solo artist, until "Torero", his duet with José Luis Rodríguez "El Puma" in 1992. The song is a plea for a long lasting night to express the strong passions he has towards his lover.

Chart performance
The song debuted on the Billboard Hot Latin Tracks chart at number 14 on 29 August 1987, and climbed to the top of the chart twelve weeks later. It spent two weeks at number-one, replacing "Ahora Te Puedes Marchar" by Mexican performer Luis Miguel and being replaced by "Y Tú También Llorarás" by Venezuelan singer-songwriter and actor José Luis Rodríguez "El Puma". "Qué No Se Rompa la Noche" spent 29 weeks on the chart and ranked at number 16 in the Hot Latin Tracks Year-End Chart of 1988.

Credits and personnel
This information adopted from Allmusic.
Manuel Alejandro – producer, piano
Assa Drori – concertina
Rafael Ferro-García – keyboards
Michael Fisher – percussion
Humberto Gatica – engineer, mixer
Julio Iglesias – vocals
Randy Kerber – keyboards
Abraham Laboriel – bass
Michael Landau – guitar
Michael Lang – keyboards
Gayle Levant – harp
Fernando López – guitar
Greg Mathieson – keyboards
Rafael Padilla – percussion
Carlos Vega – drums
Pepe Sánchez – drums

Cover versions
"Que No Se Rompa la Noche" has been recorded by several performers, including Vikki Carr on her Grammy-nominated album Emociones (a tribute album to Manuel Alejandro and Brazilian singer-songwriter Roberto Carlos); Spanish singer Tamara also did a version of this song, and included it on her album Lo Mejor de Tu Vida which was produced by Max Pierre. Tamara's album peaked at number 8 in the Spanish Album chart. Pandora, Raulin Rosendo, Rafael Ferro, Esteban Mariano, Orquesta Noche Sabrosa and Ray Conniff also recorded their own version of the track.

References

1987 singles
1987 songs
Julio Iglesias songs
Songs written by Manuel Alejandro
Spanish-language songs
CBS Discos singles
1980s ballads
Pop ballads